Mesene is a genus in the butterfly family Riodinidae present in the Neotropical realm.

Riodinidae Mesene exhibit many color variations and combinations and vary by geographic region. The males have triangular, pointed, brightly coloured forewings and small ellipsoidal hindwings. In the wing veins the species exhibit great conformity, the second subcostal vein, the upper median vein in the forewing as well as in the hindwing rise before the cell-end. They rest well hidden on the under surface of leaves but fly when disturbed somewhat like geometrids for about 10 to 20 metres always keeping in the middle of the forest roads, in order to drop again into another bush. The larvae are lycaenid like, somewhat like woodlice, fluffily haired; that of M. phareus lives on the extremely poisonous Paullinia pinnata to the leaf of which also the small greenish-yellow pupa is spun.

Species 
Mesene babosa Hall & Willmott, 1995 present in Ecuador
Mesene bomilcar (Stoll, 1790) present in French Guiana, Guyana, Suriname
Mesene celetes Bates, 1868 present in Venezuela and Brazil
Mesene citrinella Hall & Willmott, 1995 present in Ecuador, Colombia and Brazil
Mesene croceella Bates, 1865 present in Mexico and Costa Rica
Mesene cyneas (Hewitson, 1874) present in Brazil, Ecuador and Peru
Mesene epaphus (Stoll, 1780) present in French Guiana, Guyana, Suriname and Brazil
Mesene florus (Fabricius, 1793) present in Brazil
Mesene hyale C. & R. Felder, 1865 present in Colombia
Mesene ingrumaensis Callaghan & Salazar, 1999 present in Colombia
Mesene leucophrys Bates, 1868 present in Suriname, Brazil and Peru
Mesene leucopus Godman & Salvin, [1886] present in Guatemala
Mesene margaretta (White, 1843) present in Mexico, Colombia, Bolivia and Venezuela
Mesene monostigma (Erichson, [1849]) present in French Guiana, Guyana, Suriname, Venezuela and Brazil
Mesene mygdon Schaus, 1913 present in Costa Rica and Panama
Mesene nepticula Möschler, 1877 present in French Guiana, Guyana, Suriname, Ecuador, Colombia and Brazil
Mesene nola Herrich-Schäffer, [1853] present in Suriname, Ecuador, Bolivia and Brazil
Mesene paraena Bates, 1868 present in Brazil
Mesene patawa Brévignon, 1995 present in French Guiana
Mesene phareus (Cramer, [1777]) present in Mexico, Colombia, French Guiana, Guyana, Suriname, Brazil and Peru
Mesene philonis Hewitson, 1874 present in Brazil
Mesene pyrippe Hewitson, 1874 present in Brazil
Mesene sardonyx Stichel, 1910 present in Colombia
Mesene silaris Godman & Salvin, 1878 present in French Guiana, Guyana, Suriname, Ecuador, Venezuela, Guatemala and Peru
Mesene simplex Bates, 1868 present in Brazil
Mesene veleda Stichel, 1923 present in Brazil

Sources 
Mesene sur funet

External links
images representing Mesene at eol
TOL

Riodininae
Riodinidae of South America
Butterfly genera
Taxa named by Edward Doubleday